Anaerythrops is a genus of horse flies in the family Tabanidae.

Species
Anaerythrops lanei Barretto, 1948
Anaerythrops philipi Barretto, 1948

References

Tabanidae
Brachycera genera
Diptera of South America